Chabino is a rural locality (a village) in Yugskoye Rural Settlement, Cherepovetsky District, Vologda Oblast, Russia. The population was 4 as of 2002.

Geography 
Tolmachevo is the nearest rural locality.

References 

Rural localities in Cherepovetsky District